PT Merpati Nusantara Airlines, operating as Merpati Nusantara Airlines, was an airline in Indonesia based in Central Jakarta, Jakarta. It operated scheduled domestic services to more than 25 destinations in Indonesia, as well as scheduled international services to East Timor and Malaysia. The word merpati is Indonesian for "dove", and Nusantara is a Javanese word found in the Pararaton ("the Book of Kings", probably written in the 16th century) meaning "the outer islands", referring to the Indonesian archipelago. The airline was based at Soekarno-Hatta International Airport, Jakarta. It also maintained both a maintenance and simulator facility at Juanda International Airport, Surabaya. The Merpati Training Centre at Surabaya housed Fokker F-27, AVIC MA60 and CN-235 full motion simulators.

All services were suspended in 2014 due to financial and regulatory issues. After 8 years of failing to negotiate the airlines relaunch, all operating licenses and certificates were permanently revoked.

It finally dissolved on 20 February 2023.

History

With a start-up capital of 10 million rupiah, Merpati began operations in Kalimantan, using a fleet of four de Havilland Otter/DHC-3s and two DC-3 Dakotas provided by the Indonesian Air Force (TNI AU). Pilots and technicians were supplied by the Indonesian Air Force, Garuda Indonesia Airways, and other civil aviation companies. Its mission, defined by the government, was to become an 'air bridge' linking remote areas of Indonesia and thereby helping to build the economies of such regional areas. The air bridge theme is the basis of the current Merpati logo, displayed on the tails of its aircraft.

The first Managing Director appointed was Air Commodore Sutoyo Adiputro Henk (1962–1966) who had an initial staff of 17 people. In 1963, the airline expanded its routes to include Jakarta - Tanjung Karang (Bandar Lampung), Jakarta - Semarang, and Jakarta - Balikpapan. In 1964, the airline took over operations from NV de Kroonduif Garuda, increasing its aircraft fleet to 12. With the addition of three DC-3 Dakotas, two DHC-6 Twin Otters and 1 DHC-2 Beaver, Merpati began to grow, with operations now reaching Sumatra, Papua and Nusa Tenggara Barat. Further expansion saw the addition of more aircraft, including three Dornier DO-28s and six Pilatus Porter PC-6s, and staff numbers growing to 583 people.

The airline was jointly owned by the Indonesian Government (93.2%) and Garuda Indonesia (6.8%).

In June 2011, the Merpati commercial director stated that the airline was opening a tender for 15 jet airliners, including 40 aircraft with a capacity of 50 passengers and 20 additional aircraft carrying 20 passengers, such as the MA-60, the NC-212 or DHC-6 Twin Otter. The following month, with the airline suffering from financial difficulties, the government and the legislature agreed to provide a capital injection of Rp.516 billion ($60.7 million) to Merpati Nusantara Airlines in the 2012 state budget.

In February 2014, due to the airline's inability to pay its employees salary or benefits for three consecutive months, many pilots and cabin crew resigned. The same month, Merpati suspended all services due to cashflow problems, including an inability to obtain fuel on credit, obliging the company to pay cash. On 24 July 2014 it was reported that the Indonesian Ministry of Finance had decided not to reopen the company following the airline's accumulating a debt of 7.9 trillion Rp, as well as the failure of a debt-to-equity-swap plan proposed by the company.

In late 2016 the Ministry of State Owned Enterprises stated that the airline might be able to resume commercial flights in 2017 following a restructuring plan and government cash injection.

On 14 November 2018, The Panel of Judges of the Commercial Court decided to approve the peace proposal of PT Merpati Nusantara Airlines with its creditors held at the District Court (PN), Surabaya, East Java. Thus, PT Merpati Nusantara Airlines was declared not bankrupt.

However, by June 2022, The New Merpati has been presumed no longer be recovered and the airline license has been permanently revoked by the government. Thus, Merpati's obligations to third parties, such as severance pay to former employees, will be settled by selling all of its assets through an auction mechanism.

Corporate affairs
The airline's headquarters were in Central Jakarta. Previously, the airline had been based out of Kemajoran Airport.

Destinations

Fleet

Previous fleet
The Merpati fleet included the following aircraft prior to its suspension (as of January 2014):

Fleet development
In 2012, Merpati announced that it would take delivery of Airbus A320 aircraft in 2014 but, due to cash problems, this proposal was abandoned. Through a restructuring plan and government cash injection, Merpati hoped to relaunch its operations by the end of 2017 or early 2018, most likely using Boeing 737-700 or Boeing 737-800 aircraft. However, this plan was aborted as the airline decided to order other aircraft types instead.

In 2018 Merpati Nusantara signed a letter of intent for 10 Irkut MC-21-300 aircraft.

Former fleet

 ATR 72
 Airbus A300
 Airbus A310
 British Aerospace 146
 British Aerospace ATP
 Boeing 707-120B
 Boeing 707-320C
 Boeing 727
 Boeing 737-200
 Boeing 737-300
 Boeing 737-400
 de Havilland Canada DHC-6 Twin Otter
 Douglas DC-9
 Fokker F27 Friendship
 Fokker F28 Fellowship
 Fokker 100
 CASA/IPTN CN-235
 Indonesian Aerospace 212-200
 Hawker Siddeley 748
 NAMC YS-11
 Lockheed L-100 Hercules
 Vickers Vanguard
 Vickers Viscount
 De Havilland Comet

Merpati Training Center
Merpati Training Center is a division of strategic business unit and is one of the largest aviation training centres in Indonesia. It conducts ground school courses for pilots, flight attendants, flight operation officers (dispatchers), commercial airline operations and administration staff in the region. The training centre was founded in 1994 and known as 'Flight Safety Training' training initially Merpati's own staff, but later changed its name to the Merpati Training Center (MTC) in 1999. Some of MTC's clients include the national airline, Garuda Indonesia, Sriwijaya Air, Batavia Air, Lion Air, and Pelita Air Service, among others.

Courses conducted by the MTC include type rating courses for pilots, flight attendants and flight operation officers on the Boeing 737 Classic, AVIC Xian MA60, Fokker F27, CASA CN-235, DHC-6 Twin Otter, CASA C-212 Aviocar, as well as other ground courses including Dangerous Goods Awareness, Airline Transport Pilot License (ATPL) theory, Cockpit Resources Management (CRM), Reduced Vertical Separation Minimum (RVSM), Approach and Landing Accident Reduction (ALAR), Safety Management Systems (SMS), Aviation Security (AVSEC) and Windshear Avoidance.

MTC has two campuses, located in Jakarta and Surabaya. MTC's Jakarta campus is located on 11th Floor of the Merpati Building in Kemayoran, whereas the Surabaya campus is located at Juanda International Airport.

Merpati Pilot School

On 16 February 2010, the Merpati Pilot School, a department of the MTC, was officially launched at Surabaya's Juanda International Airport. The flying school was awarded its Part 141 certification from the Directorate General of Civil Aviation on 18 August 2009 and currently has a fleet of four Cessna C172s, registered PK-MSA, PK-MSH, PK-MSN and PK-MST. Ground school for cadet pilots are conducted at the Merpati Training Centre in Surabaya, and flight training is conducted from Budiarto Airport, Curug (near Jakarta) as well as Trunojoyo Airport, Sumenep on the island of Madura. Flight Instructors at Merpati Pilot School are all current line pilots with Merpati Nusantara Airlines each with thousands of hours' flying experience.

Accidents and incidents

 On 5 April 1972, a Vickers Viscount was the subject of an attempted hijacking. The hijacker was killed.
 On 7 February 1977, a Douglas C-47A PK-NDH was damaged beyond economic repair in a landing accident at Tanjung Santan Airport.
On 5 October 1978, a Douglas C-47A PK-NDI caught fire whilst parked at Ngurah Rai International Airport, Bali and was destroyed.
 On 30 January 1991, Flight 7970, a Fokker 27 crashed after takeoff from Sam Ratulangi International Airport, all passengers survived. 
 On 18 October 1992, Merpati Nusantara Airlines Flight 5601, a CASA/IPTN CN-235 crashed into Mount Papandayan killing all 31 passengers and crew on board including Merpati's only female pilot at the time.
 On 1 July 1993, Merpati Nusantara Airlines Flight 724, a Fokker F28 registered as PK-GFU, ditched into the sea off Sorong, West Papua after striking high ground. 41 people were drowned in the incident. 2 people were injured.
 On 30 November 1994, Merpati Nusantara Airlines Flight 422, a Fokker F28 overran the runway at Achmad Yani International Airport with no casualties among the 85 on board.
 On 10 January 1995, Flight 6715, a de Havilland Canada DHC-6, went missing over the Molo Strait. All 14 people on board were likely killed. Investigators suspected that an explosion occurred on the lower cargo compartment.
 On 7 September 1997, a CASA 212 registered as PK-NCS slammed onto terrain while on approach to Pattimura Airport in Ambon. All 3 people on board were killed.
All 16 people on board were killed.
 On 3 December 2009, a Fokker 100 PK-MJD made an emergency landing at El Tari Airport, Kupang when the left main gear failed to extend. There were no injuries among the passengers and crew.
 On 7 May 2011, Merpati Nusantara Airlines Flight 8968, a Xian MA60 PK-MZK, operating on the Sorong-Kaimana route, crashed in the sea, killing all 25 people on board.
 On 3 December 2011, a CASA C-212 Aviocar passenger plane sustained substantial damage in a landing accident at Larat-Watidar Airport, Indonesia. There were three crew members and 19 passengers on board. Two passengers suffered minor injuries.
 On 10 June 2013, a Xian MA60 PK-MZO, operating Flight 6517 from Bajawa to Kupang with 50 people on board, crash-landed at Kupang airport in East Nusa Tenggara, Indonesia. One passenger was injured. The aircraft, which has been damaged beyond repair, lay on its belly on the runway with its engines jammed face down into the tarmac and its wings bent forward.

References

External links

Official website
Merpati Training Centre
Merpati Nusantara Airlines Fleet

 
Defunct airlines of Indonesia
Airlines established in 1962
Airlines formerly banned in the European Union
Government-owned airlines
Indonesian companies established in 1962